Hloubětín is a district of Prague located  from the centre, belonging mostly to Prague 9, with parts of it also belonging to Prague 14 and Prague 10. There were 10,704 people living in this area in 2001. The area, first recorded in the 13th century due to presence of the Teutonic Knights, became part of Prague in 1922. Today it is mainly an industrial area, located on the edge of Prague's so-called průmyslový polookruh (industrial semi-circle). During communist times, Hloubětín was well known as the home of the Tesla company.

Etymology

The name "Hloubětín" derives from the surname Hlúpata, and was previously known as Lupatin, Glupetin, Hlupetin and Hloupětín before becoming Hloubětín in 1907.

Geography

The area lies on the Rokytka river, and its northern reaches back onto the area of Kbely Airport. To the west of Hloubětín lies Hořejší rybník, a protected area centered on a lake.

Transport

Hloubětín is located close to the D11 and R10 roads, and Praha-Kyje railway station on the main corridor linking Prague and Pardubice. It is served by Hloubětín metro station on Line B of the Prague Metro, which opened in 1999. It is also an important hub on the Prague tram system.

References

External links

 Prague 9 official website

Districts of Prague